John Federate "Fred" Metcalf (27 July 1899 – 10 May 1975) was an Australian rules footballer who played with North Melbourne in the Victorian Football League (VFL).

Metcalf was already an established player at North Melbourne when they left the Victorian Football Association for the VFL in 1925. He played a prominent part in their win over Geelong in the opening round of the 1925 VFL season, with a club best three goals. By the end of the season he had amassed 21 goals, to finish third in North Melbourne's goal-kicking. The following year he was their leading goal-kicker, with 26 goals.

References

External links

1899 births
1975 deaths
Australian rules footballers from Bendigo
Australian Rules footballers: place kick exponents
North Melbourne Football Club players
North Melbourne Football Club (VFA) players